Pavol Demitra Ice Stadium (Slovak: Zimný Štadión Pavla Demitru) and formerly B.O.F. Arena, is an arena in Trenčín, Slovakia. The stadium is primarily used for ice hockey, and is the home arena of the Slovak Extraliga club, HK Dukla Trenčín.  It has a capacity of 6,150 spectators and was built in 1960.

The arena is named after the professional ice hockey player, a three-time National Hockey League All-Star, Pavol Demitra. The name change occurred in 2011 after the 2011 Lokomotiv Yaroslavl plane crash on 7 September 2011, which killed Demitra and the rest of the Lokomotiv team.

Notable events
An overview of some sport events:

1987
1987 IIHF World Under-20 Championship

References

Indoor ice hockey venues in Slovakia
Buildings and structures in Trenčín
Sport in Trenčín Region